A transect is a path along which one counts and records occurrences of the objects of study (e.g. plants).

There are several types of transect. Some are more effective than others.

It requires an observer to move along a fixed path and to count occurrences along the path and, at the same time (in some procedures), obtain the distance of the object from the path. This results in an estimate of the area covered and an estimate of the way in which detectability increases from probability 0 (far from the path) towards 1 (near the path). Using the raw count and this probability function, one can arrive at an estimate of the actual density of objects.

The estimation of the abundance of populations (such as terrestrial mammal species) can be achieved using a number of different types of transect methods, such as strip transects, line transects, belt transects, point transects and curved line transects.

See also 
 
  – Method for estimating a species population size

References

External links 
 

Scientific observation
Ecological techniques
Environmental statistics
Environmental Sampling Equipment